George Victor Schlitz (11 August 1909 – 21 March 1989) was an Australian rules footballer who played with St Kilda in the Victorian Football League (VFL).

Notes

External links 

1909 births
1989 deaths
Australian rules footballers from New South Wales
St Kilda Football Club players